Boy Meets Girl is a 1984 French drama film, written and directed by Leos Carax, starring Denis Lavant and Mireille Perrier. It was Carax's first feature film. The plot follows the relationship between an aspiring filmmaker (Denis Lavant), who has just been left by his lover, and a suicidal young woman (Mireille Perrier), who is also reeling from a failed romance.

Plot
Alex, a jaded young man in Paris, has been abandoned by his girlfriend Florence for his friend Thomas. He now lives alone in a small room with few possessions. He is soon to enter military service (as revealed in an outrageous telephone conversation with his father). A springtime heat wave exacerbates his restlessness.

Mireille and Bernard are a second young couple with a dysfunctional relationship. When Bernard leaves their apartment one night, and then uses the intercom to ask Mireille a favor, they end up having an intimate conversation which is audible to Alex, who happened to be passing in the street. Alex follows Bernard to a bar, and later retrieves a piece of paper that Bernard drops. This proves to be a party invitation. Back at the apartment, Mireille appears to be on the verge of committing suicide. Defeating the urge, she practices a tap-dancing routine, intercut with Alex wandering the streets, listening to his portable tape deck.

Alex writes a farewell letter to Florence, and shoplifts some records as a gift. Delivering these to her new address, he is almost caught in the hallway by Florence, who is in the middle of having sex with Thomas. Leaving the building undetected, he proceeds to the party to which Bernard and Mireille were invited. Bernard is observed leaving early, but Mireille remains, and Alex attempts to strike up a conversation with her (after lying to the hostess that he is a friend of Bernard's, and being introduced to the other guests accordingly).

Alex borrows the telephone to ascertain Florence's receipt of his note, and then stumbles across Mireille in a bathroom holding a scissors blade to her wrist. He quickly retreats to the kitchen, where the hostess explains to him that the party is to commemorate the death of her brother, with whom she shared a telepathic bond. Mireille enters quietly, having cut her hair short, to the shock of the hostess. Alex and Mireille, left alone, discuss their histories and ambitions; Alex claims to be an aspiring filmmaker, though he has gone no further than come up with titles, whereas Mireille was lured to the city in hopes of acting or modeling, but never caught a break. Alex makes a rambling profession of love, but Mireille does not encourage him, beyond accompanying him partway to the train station where he will embark on his military career.

Alex leaves the train on the pretense of finding a restroom, but winds up playing pinball at the bar, and the train leaves without him. He phones Mireille from a telephone booth, having gleaned her number from the hostess' address book, but she does not answer. He hurries to her apartment, finds the door unlocked, sees her seated in the living room, and embraces her from behind. To his shock, she collapses, bleeding at the mouth. A flashback reveals that she had once again been holding a pair of scissors to her wrist. When Alex entered, she assumed it was Bernard, and hastily concealed the scissors beneath her clothes. When Alex embraced her, the blades inflicted a presumably fatal wound.

Cast
 Denis Lavant as Alex
 Mireille Perrier as Mireille
 Carroll Brooks as Helen
 Maïté Nahyr as Maïte
 Anna Baldaccini as Florence

Reception
The film premiered at the 1984 International Critics' Week, an independent parallel section to the Cannes Film Festival. It was released in France on 21 November 1984. Vincent Canby reviewed the film for The New York Times: "Mr. Carax is 24, but Boy Meets Girl looks like the work of a talented 18-year-old, someone who still spends more time inside the Cinematheque Francaise than outside it. ... In Boy Meets Girl, one recognizes a bit of Jean-Luc Godard here, something of Francois Truffaut there, and every now and then one hears what may be the faint, original voice of Mr. Carax trying to make himself heard around and through the images of others." Canby added however that "Boy Meets Girl has been handsomely photographed (by Jean-Yves Escoffier) in black-and-white images that look as velvety smooth as fudge sauce atop vanilla ice cream. The performances are perfectly decent -Miss Perrier is especially good in a long Godardian monologue. What's still missing is the film maker's own idiosyncratic personality, which, if it exists, could surface in Mr. Carax's next film." The film had a total of 131,042 admissions in France.

References

External links
 
 

1984 drama films
1984 films
French black-and-white films
Films directed by Leos Carax
French drama films
1980s French-language films
Films set in Paris
1980s French films